Cherpuk Group is a group of two cinder cones located in the central part of Kamchatka Peninsula, Russia. It is a group of a few mostly dormant cinder cones.

See also
 List of volcanoes in Russia

References 
 

Mountains of the Kamchatka Peninsula
Volcanoes of the Kamchatka Peninsula
Pyroclastic cones